Daddy Dearest was a 1990s television situation comedy. 

Daddy Dearest is a 2016 Hong Kong TVB television series.

Daddy Dearest is also the name of:

Television series episodes
 Daddy's Dearest was a Dallas episode
 Daddy Dearest (Phil of the Future episode)
 Daddy Dearest (Charmed episode)
 Daddy Dearest, Obra (TV series) episode
 An episode of Cold Case Files
 Daddy Dearest and the Dueling Divas was an episode of The Real World: Brooklyn
 An episode of  Zevo-3
 An episode of Jack of All Trades (TV series)
 An episode of Yvon of the Yukon
 A Radio Free Roscoe episode
 Daddy Dearest (Sonny Boy) an episode of Queer as Folk (season 1)
 An episode of What's with Andy?
 An According to Jim episode
 A Martin episode
 A Drew Carey Show episode
 A Dinosaur King episode

Musical tracks
On:
 I Phantom by Mr Lif
 I Phantom Instrumentals by Mr Lif
 Through Thick and Thin by Dogwood

Comics
 Issue four of the comic, The Pitt.
 An unpublished issue of the comic Ghost Rider 2099

See also
"Father Dearest", a 2012 episode of the long-running NBC legal drama, Law & Order: Special Victims Unit.
 Mommie Dearest
 Daddy Dearest, a character from Friday Night Funkin'.